Ectatosia maculosa is a species of beetle in the family Cerambycidae. It was described by Fisher in 1935. It is known from Borneo.

References

Desmiphorini
Beetles described in 1935